Cırdaxan (also, Dzhirdakhan) is a village in the Samukh Rayon of Azerbaijan.

References 

Populated places in Samukh District